Gulielmus Bucanus (Guillaume Du Buc, in English William Bucanus) (died 1603) was a Swiss-French Calvinist theologian. His Institutiones theologicae (Geneva, 1602) was one of the first systematic works of theology of the Reformed Church.

Life

He was born at Rouen. He was a regent master at the Collège de Lausanne in 1564, and then was ordained deacon in 1568. He became pastor at Yverdon in 1571, and was theology professor at the Lausanne Academy from 1591. He was invited to a position at the Saumur Academy, but died before he could take it up.

References
 http://www.hls-dhs-dss.ch/textes/f/F11062.php

Further reading
Encyclopedia Reformata page

External links

1603 deaths
16th-century French theologians
Swiss Calvinist and Reformed theologians
Year of birth unknown
16th-century Calvinist and Reformed theologians